Sarcoptilus is a genus of sea pen.

Description 
They are colonial medium-sized sea pens with relatively tiny polyps.

Species 

 Sarcoptilus bollonsi (Benham, 1906)
 Sarcoptilus grandis Gray, 1848
 Sarcoptilus nullispiculatus Williams, 1995
 Sarcoptilus rigidis Williams, 1995
 Sarcoptilus shaneparkeri Williams, 1995
 Sarcoptilus roseum? (Broch, 1910)

References 

Pennatulidae